is one of the 18 wards of the city of Yokohama in Kanagawa Prefecture, Japan. As of 2010, the ward had an estimated population of 124,845 and a density of 6,750 persons per km². The total area was 18.55 km².

Geography
Sakae Ward is located in eastern Kanagawa Prefecture, and on the southwestern borders of the city of Yokohama. The area is largely flatland, with scattered small hills.

Surrounding municipalities
Isogo Ward
Kanazawa Ward
Totsuka Ward
Konan Ward
Kamakura, Kanagawa

History
The area around present-day Sakae Ward has been inhabited continuously for thousands of years. Archaeologists have found stone tools from the Japanese Paleolithic period and ceramic shards from the Jōmon period, house ruins from the Yayoi period and tombs from the Kofun period at numerous locations in the area. Under the Nara period Ritsuryō system, it became part of Kamakura District in Sagami Province. By the Kamakura period, much of the area was farmland supporting the population of nearby Kamakura. Most of the area came under the control of the Nagao clan, the ancestors of the Uesugi clan. During the Edo period, the territory came under the control of Tokugawa Ieyasu. It was administered as tenryō territory controlled directly by the Tokugawa shogunate, but administered through various hatamoto.

After the Meiji Restoration, Sakae  became part of the new Kanagawa Prefecture in 1868. In the cadastral reform of April 1, 1889, the area was divided into Hongo, Sakae and Toyota villages under Kamakura District. In 1938, the Imperial Japanese Navy established a large fuel depot in former Hongo Village. On April 1, 1939, Sakae was annexed by the neighboring city of Yokohama, becoming part of Totsuka Ward. In the post-war period, parts of Sakae were used as a residential area for the American occupation forces. All American facilities were returned to Japan by 1967. In a major administrative reorganization of October 1, 1969, Totsuka-ku was divided, and Sakae emerged as an independent ward within the city of Yokohama.

Economy
Sakae Ward is largely a regional commercial center and bedroom community for central Yokohama and Tokyo. There are a number of industries, including factories operated by Nikon, Fancl, Sumitomo Electric Industries and Shibaura Mecatronics.

Transportation

Railroads
JR East – Negishi Line
 
The Yokosuka Line and Tōkaidō Main Line pass through Sakae Ward, but without any stations.

Highways
Ken-Ō Expressway

Education
Prefectural senior high schools are operated by the Kanagawa Prefectural Board of Education:

Private secondary school:

 operates municipal elementary schools and junior high schools.

Junior high schools:

Hongō (本郷)
Iijima (飯島)
Kamigō (上郷)
Katsuradai (桂台)
Koyamadai (小山台)
Nishihongō (西本郷)

Elementary schools:

Hongō (本郷)
Hongōdai (本郷台)
Iijima (飯島)
Kamigō (上郷)
Kasama (笠間)
Katsuradai (桂台)
Kosugaya (小菅ケ谷)
Koyamadai (小山台)
Kuden (公田)
Nishihongō (西本郷)
Sakurai (桜井)
Senshū (千秀)
Shōdo (庄戸)
Toyoda (豊田)

Additionally, Hino Minami Elementary School (日野南小学校) and Konandaidaini (No. 2) Elementary School (港南台第二小学校), outside of Sakae-ku, have attendance zones including parts of Sakae-ku.

Noshichiri Elementary School merged with Shodo Elementary School in March 2006.

Noted people from Sakae Ward
Shigetoshi Hasebe, professional soccer player
Kozo Yuki, professional soccer player
Hironori Kusano, singer
Daisuke Maki, (singer, member of EXILE )
Ryuichi Kawahara, (former baseball player, belonged to the Yokohama BayStars)

References
 Kato, Yuzo. Yokohama Past and Present. Yokohama City University (1990).

External links
 Sakae Ward Office
 City of Yokohama statistics
 

Wards of Yokohama